Oliver William Twisleton-Wykeham-Fiennes (17 May 1926 – 8 June 2011) was Dean of Lincoln in the latter part of the 20th century.

Early life and education
He was born on 17 May 1926 into a noble family, the youngest of three sons of the 20th Baron Saye and Sele. He was educated at Eton College and won the Sword of Honour as best overall cadet at the Royal Military College, Sandhurst. He was commissioned into the Rifle Brigade on 1 September 1945 as a second lieutenant, but saw no fighting as the Second World War ended soon afterwards. He subsequently went up to New College, Oxford.

Ordained ministry
Ordained in 1954, after a spell as a curate at St Mary Magdalene, New Milton, he became chaplain of Clifton College in 1958. Following this he was rector of Lambeth before his elevation to the deanery. Described by Trevor Beeson as “the last aristocrat to make his mark on the church", in retirement he lived near his old Cathedral in Lincoln until his death in June 2011.

Notes

References

External links

1926 births
2011 deaths
People educated at Eton College
Alumni of New College, Oxford
Alumni of Ripon College Cuddesdon
Deans of Lincoln
Graduates of the Royal Military College, Sandhurst
Green Howards officers
Younger sons of barons